Fulham Grange was a railway station on the Outer Circle located in the suburb of Alphington, Melbourne, Australia. Located near the Grange and Heidelberg Road intersection, it was a quarter mile (0.4 km) from Fairfield Park station. Opened to serve the speculative housing estate after which it was named, it was provided with 2 side platforms, one located on a loop to the north of the main line. The station was opened with the line on 24 March 1891, and closed with it on 12 April 1893. The line through it reopened on 29 July 1919, as part of the APM Siding, closing again in the 1990s.

References
 

Railway stations in Australia opened in 1891
Railway stations closed in 1893
Disused railway stations in Melbourne